Hyperolius nienokouensis is a species of frogs in the family Hyperoliidae. It is endemic to Ivory Coast.  It is only known from the Taï National Park and one locality 30 km to the north. 
Its natural habitats are subtropical or tropical moist lowland forests, swamps, and intermittent freshwater marshes.
It is threatened by habitat loss.

References

nienokouensis
Endemic fauna of Ivory Coast
Amphibians of West Africa
Amphibians described in 1998
Taxonomy articles created by Polbot